Jacqueline Schaeffer (born October 26, 1978) is an American filmmaker best known for her 2009 feature film debut TiMER and for her work in the Marvel Cinematic Universe creating the Disney+ television miniseries WandaVision and co-writing the initial story to the film Black Widow.

Life and career
Schaeffer grew up in Agoura Hills, California and was inspired by filmmakers Quentin Tarantino, Robert Rodriguez, Allison Anders, and Lisa Cholodenko as a teenager. Schaeffer graduated from Princeton University with an A.B. in English in 2000 after completing an 81-page senior thesis, titled "Splinter in the Mind: The Dilemma of the Political Dystopian Protagonist and the Cyberpunk Hero", under the supervision of Maria DiBattista. She went on to earn a Master of Fine Arts in Film Production from the USC School of Cinematic Arts. She wrote for the Princeton Triangle Club theatre groupe, where she played versions of herself. She is Jewish on her father's side, and has two children.

She wrote, produced and directed her first feature film, an science fiction romantic comedy called TiMER starring Emma Caulfield. The film premiered at the 2009 Tribeca Film Festival and saw a limited US release a year later.

Schaeffer wrote The Hustle, a Dirty Rotten Scoundrels remake starring Anne Hathaway and Rebel Wilson, which was released in May 2019. Schaeffer is also developing her Blacklisted-script The Shower with Hathaway.

Schaeffer contributed to the screenplay for the Marvel Studios film Captain Marvel with Geneva Robertson-Dworet, Anna Boden and Ryan Fleck. The film was released on March 8, 2019.

Schaeffer also wrote the Marvel Studios film Black Widow starring Scarlett Johansson, until she was replaced with Ned Benson, who was in turn replaced by Eric Pearson. She was also hired by Marvel to write the first and final episodes and serve as head writer for the Disney+ miniseries WandaVision, in January 2019. In May 2021, she signed a three-year overall deal with Marvel Studios and 20th Television to develop projects for them, including two series planned as WandaVision spin-offs: Agatha: Coven of Chaos, centered on Agatha Harkness; and Vision Quest, centered on The Vision.

Filmography

Film

Television

References

External links

Biography at timerthemovie.com

1978 births
21st-century American Jews
21st-century American screenwriters
21st-century American women writers
American film producers
American screenwriters
American women film directors
American women film producers
American women screenwriters
American women television producers
Film directors from California
Jewish American screenwriters
Jewish film people
Nebula Award winners
Living people
People from Agoura Hills, California
Place of birth missing (living people)
Princeton University alumni
Screenwriters from California
Showrunners
Television producers from California
USC School of Cinematic Arts alumni